Cube Route is a fantasy novel by British-American writer Piers Anthony, the twenty-seventh book of the Xanth series.

Pangrammatic window
The shortest known published pangrammatic window, a stretch of naturally occurring text that contains all the letters in the alphabet, is found on page 98 of the 2004 First Mass Market Edition.  The passage, which is 42 letters long (in boldface), reads:  "We are all from Xanth," Cube said quickly. "Just visiting Phaze. We just want to find the dragon."

References

 27
2003 American novels
Tor Books books